The Italy Women's Cup was an Italian invitational women's football competition organized by the Lega Nazionale Dilettanti confronting the 2nd, 3rd and 4th ranking teams in the Serie A Femminile, the Italian Women's Cup champion or runner-up and several foreign clubs. Established in 2003, it intended to develop itself into the UEFA Cup's female counterpart but it was never recognized by UEFA. Five editions were carried out until 2008 before it was discontinued. Torres CF was the competition's most successful team with two titles. SS Lazio, Lada Togliatti and Lehenda Chernihiv also won one title each.

List of finals

Results

2003

Group stage

Semifinals

|}

Final

|}

2004

Group stage

Semifinals

|}

Final

|}

2005

Group stage

Semifinals

|}

3rd position

|}

Final

|}

2006

Group stage

Semifinals

|}

3rd position

|}

Final

|}

2008

Group stage

Semifinals

|}

3rd position

|}

Final

|}

References

Women's football friendly trophies
Recurring sporting events established in 2003
Women's football competitions in Italy
Women's Cup
Women's Cup
2003 in women's association football
2004 in women's association football
2005 in women's association football
2006 in women's association football
2008 in women's association football
Cup
Cup
Cup
Cup
Cup
2008 disestablishments in Italy